Jean-Claude Scherrer (born 20 July 1978) is a former professional tennis player from Switzerland who entered professional play in 1998.

Career finals

Doubles (2 losses)

External links
 
 
 The official personal website of Jean-Claude Scherrer 

Swiss male tennis players
1978 births
Living people